Yehuda Berg was a co-director of the Kabbalah Centre, which was founded by his parents Philip Berg and Karen Berg. However, after allegations of sexual assault and allegations of offering drugs from one of his students, he stepped away from the organization. He was later found liable in a civil suit and ordered to pay damages to his victim for inflicting malice and intentional harm.

Berg was an international speaker and author.  One of his many books, The Power of Kabbalah, became an international best-seller as did another of his books, The 72 Names of God.

In February 2009, Berg launched a radio show on Sirius XM's Stars Channel entitled The Life You Create.

Biography 
Berg was born in 1972 in Jerusalem.
Until May 2014, he was co-director of the Kabbalah Centre, founded by his father Rav Shraga Feivel (Philip) Berg. 
Following accusations of drug abuse and sexual assault, he withdrew from the organization.

Works 
He has written numerous works such as:
The power of Kabbalah, The 72 names of god: technology for the soul, Kabbalah the power to change everything, Satan: an autobiography, True prosperity, Angelic intelligence, among others.

Lawsuit 
In 2014, a former student at the Kabbalah Centre brought a lawsuit against him alleging that he had assaulted her sexually. She claimed that Berg offered her alcohol and Vicodin while she visited him at his home and then made sexual advances.

In November 2015 a Los Angeles Superior Court jury found that Berg had acted with malice and was liable for intentional infliction of emotional distress and therefore, he was ordered to pay $135,000, which included a punitive damages component. The Kabbalah Centre itself was also ordered to pay $42,500 for being negligent in its supervision of Berg, who was one of its co-directors at the time of the alleged assault.

Awards 
In 2007, Berg was named Number 4 in Newsweek's list of America's Top 50 Rabbis.

In 2009, GQ magazine's The Gentlemen's Fund honored him for being an Agent of Change in the field of Education.

Bibliography

References

External links

 
 

Living people
Jewish American writers
Year of birth missing (living people)
Place of birth missing (living people)
American bloggers
21st-century American Jews